Paulino Martínez Soria (born 14 August 1973), known simply as Paulino, is a Spanish former footballer who played as a striker.

He played for 14 clubs across four levels of Spanish football in his career, mainly in Segunda División B.

Club career
Paulino was born in Albacete, Castile-La Mancha. After making his professional debut with UD Melilla, he went on to represent Albacete Balompié (two stints with the reserves), Águilas CF, Yeclano CF, Atlético Madrid – mainly registered with the B side – Átlético Marbella, CD Manchego, CD Ourense, UD Melilla, AD Ceuta, CD Logroñés, Cultural y Deportiva Leonesa, Universidad de Las Palmas CF, Racing Club Portuense, CF Palencia and CF Villanovense.

During the 1994–95 season, Paulino appeared in five first-team matches with Atlético, totalling 58 minutes in La Liga. His debut in the competition took place on 5 March 1995, as a late substitute in a 1–0 away win against Real Valladolid.

Paulino retired in June 2013 at nearly 40 years of age, after two seasons in Segunda División B with Villanovense, suffering relegation in his second. He amassed competition totals of 472 games and 141 goals, playoff appearances notwithstanding.

References

External links

1973 births
Living people
Sportspeople from Albacete
Spanish footballers
Footballers from Castilla–La Mancha
Association football forwards
La Liga players
Segunda División players
Segunda División B players
Tercera División players
UD Melilla footballers
Atlético Albacete players
Águilas CF players
Yeclano CF players
Atlético Madrid B players
Atlético Madrid footballers
CA Marbella footballers
CD Ourense footballers
AD Ceuta footballers
CD Logroñés footballers
Cultural Leonesa footballers
Universidad de Las Palmas CF footballers
CF Palencia footballers
CF Villanovense players
Spanish football managers